Irma Hopper (July 14, 1890 – January 29, 1963) was an American fencer. She competed in the women's individual foil events at the 1924 and 1928 Summer Olympics.

References

External links
 

1890 births
1963 deaths
American female foil fencers
Olympic fencers of the United States
Fencers at the 1924 Summer Olympics
Fencers at the 1928 Summer Olympics
People from Galesburg, Illinois
20th-century American women